The 2014–15 Regionalliga was the seventh season of the Regionalliga, the third under the new format, as the fourth tier of the German football league system. The champions of Regionalliga West – Fortuna Köln – and the winner – SG Sonnenhof Großaspach – and third-placed team - FSV Mainz 05 II - of the Regionalliga Südwest were promoted to the 3. Liga. SV Elversberg, Wacker Burghausen and Saarbrücken were relegated from 3. Liga.

Regionalliga Nord 
18 teams from the states of Bremen, Hamburg, Lower Saxony and Schleswig-Holstein competed in the third season of the reformed Regionalliga Nord. 15 teams were retained from the last season and 3 teams were promoted from the Oberliga – Niedersachsenliga champions Lüneburger SK Hansa and the two Regionalliga North promotion playoff winners VfB Lübeck and FT Braunschweig.

League table

Regionalliga Nordost 
16 teams from the states of Berlin, Brandenburg, Mecklenburg-Vorpommern, Saxony, Saxony-Anhalt and Thuringia competed in the third season of the reformed Regionalliga Nordost. 13 teams were retained from the last season and 2 teams that were promoted from the Oberliga. BFC Dynamo qualified by winning NOFV-Oberliga Nord and Bautzen qualified by winning NOFV-Oberliga Süd.

League table

Regionalliga West 
18 teams from North Rhine-Westphalia competed in the third season of the reformed Regionalliga West: 15 teams were retained from the last season. FC Kray won Oberliga Niederrhein and Hennef the Oberliga Mittelrhein. Rödinghausen placed second in the Oberliga Westfalen although Arminia Bielefeld II won the competition but was unable to be promoted as the first team played in the 3. Liga.

League table

Regionalliga Südwest 
18 teams from Baden-Württemberg, Hesse, Rhineland-Palatinate and Saarland competed in the third season of the Regionalliga Südwest. Elversberg and Saarbrücken relegated from the 3. Liga. 13 teams were retained from last season and 3 teams were promoted from the Oberliga: Astoria Walldorf won the Oberliga Baden-Württemberg and Pirmasens won the Oberliga Rheinland-Pfalz/Saar. As no team from the Hessenliga applied for a licence, the second-placed teams of the other Oberligas had a play-off match which was won by Nöttingen.

League table

Regionalliga Bayern 
18 teams from Bavaria competed in the third season of the Regionalliga Bayern. 13 teams were retained from the last season. Wacker Burghausen relegated from the 3. Liga. 2 teams were promoted from the Bayernliga. Bayreuth won Bayernliga Nord and Garching - runner-up of the Bayernliga Süd - gained promotion due to the withdrawal from competition of BC Aichach.

League table

Promotion play-offs
The draw for the 2014–15 promotion play-offs was held on 12 April, with another draw between the Regionalliga Südwest teams held on 2 May 2015.

Summary
The first legs were played on 27 May, and the second legs were played on 31 May 2015.

Matches
All times Central European Summer Time (UTC+2)

1–1 on aggregate. Würzburger Kickers won 6–5 on penalties.

1. FC Magdeburg won 4–1 on aggregate.

Werder Bremen II won 2–0 on aggregate.

References

External links
  The Regionalligas DFB.de

2014-15
4
Ger